Shandy Hall is the name of a homestead museum located in Harpersfield, Ohio, owned and maintained by the Western Reserve Historical Society.

The original rooms of Shandy Hall were built in 1815 by Col. Robert Harper, a son of Alexander Harper, namesake of the township and the first permanent settler in that area.  
Considered the oldest frame residence in this section of the state, Shandy Hall eventually grew into an 18-room home, practically a mansion by frontier standards.  Shandy Hall was named by Robert Harper's daughter, Ann, after her favorite book, Tristram Shandy.  Her copy of the book remains at the museum to this day.  Shandy Hall, together with many of its original antique furnishings, was donated to the Western Reserve Historical Society in the 1930s. Although a museum, the property does not have regular hours for public visits; tours are by appointment only.  The majority of the pieces on display are original to the home.

References

External links
Shandy Hall

Historic house museums in Ohio
Houses on the National Register of Historic Places in Ohio
Houses completed in 1815
Museums in Ashtabula County, Ohio
National Register of Historic Places in Ashtabula County, Ohio
Historical society museums in Ohio
Houses in Ashtabula County, Ohio